Fulvio Croce (6 June 1901 – 28 April 1977) was an Italian lawyer. The president of the Turin Bar Association, he was killed by a terrorist group, the Red Brigades.

Biography 
The great-grandson of Costantino Nigra, Croce was born in 1901 in Castelnuovo Nigra, in the Piedmont region. In 1924, he graduated in jurisprudence. After the Armistice of Cassibile of 8 September 1943, Croce joined the Alpini and the Italian resistance movement. He was elected president of the Turin Bar Association in 1968. In 1977, it began in Turin the trial against some members of the Red Brigades; they were Renato Curcio, Alberto Franceschini, and Prospero Gallinari. At the first hearing of the trial, something totally new in Italy happened, as all the defendants refused to be defended by a counsellor and threatened death to any lawyer who would have accepted to be appointed as their counsellor by the court.

The defendants contended that the court did not have the authority to judge them. During the first hearing, Ferrari read a statement on behalf of all the defendants. It said that "we proclaim ourselves members of the communist organization Red Brigades. And being communist combatants, we take jointly take the political charge of all the actions of the organization. Given that, we claim there is no legal ground for this trial. The defendants have no reason to defend themselves. On the opposite, the prosecutors have to defend the criminal and anti-proletarian practice of the infamous regime that they represent. ... To be clear, we repeat our counsellors' power of attorneys and we invite them to refuse any possible appointment ex officio ... ." , the presiding judge of the Turin Corte d'Assise, appointed Croce as counsellor of the defendants, in his capacity of president of the Bar Association. Although Croce was conscious of the serious danger, he accepted the defence and appointed as co-counsellors some other members of the Turin Bar Association Board of Governors; among them was Franzo Grande Stevens, who was charged of the defence of Renato Curcio.

At the hearing of 7 June 1976, Grande Stevens, in accord with Croce, contended that Article 130 of the Italian Code of Criminal Procedure, which compels every defendant, even against his will and one charged of political crimes, to be defended by a counsellor, was unconstitutional. Grande Stevens contended that this article was in conflict with the European Convention on Human Rights, which gives everyone the right "to defend himself in person or through legal assistance of his own choosing" according to Article 6.3. He contended that to be represented by a lawyer is a right, not an obligation. The Court of Assizes rejected this claim of unconstitutionality, perhaps biased by the murder of a district attorney, by the Red Brigades occurred a few days before. Consequently, Croce and the other co-counsellors kept defending the members of the Red Brigades. On 28 April 1977, Croce was killed. Three men shot at him five times using a Nagant 7.62, which was the same gun used to kill Carlo Casalegno. The Red Brigades revendicated the action through a phone call. In leaflets, they stated: "On 28 April 1977 a commando of the Red Brigades has executed the state servant Fulvio Croce."

Memory 
On 5 December 1977, Croce received the Gold Medal Award for Civil Valour. The book Life of a Lawyer by Franzo Grande Stevens was published by Cedam in 2000. The Foundation Memorial Fulvio Croce was established in 2004. In 2007,  and the Turin Bar Association produced the documentary film Avvocato! Il processo di Torino al nucleo storico delle Brigate rosse. During some solemn commitment ceremonies and immediately after the ritual oath, the Council of the Milan Bar Association donated a copy of the film to each young new lawyer. The film was directed by Marino Bronzino.

Since 2010, a courtroom in the criminal hearings of the court of Trento is dedicated to Croce and Giorgio Ambrosoli. Since 2014, a courtroom in the Palace of Justice in Ascoli Piceno is dedicated to Croce, "a perennial remembrance, victim of terrorism". On 9 May 2016, a memorial plaque was affixed to the wall of the house in via Perrone 5, where the fatal attack took place, by the Municipality of Turin.

On the fortieth anniversary of his death in 2018, the Criminal Chamber of western Piedmont remembered him as "a great lawyer who sacrificed his life in the name of the right to defense, an example for all citizens and also for us." A letter sent to its members read: "He was barbarously killed because he did his duty, because he honoured the toga, and served the state, thus implementing the Constitution."

Honours 
  Gold Medal Award for Civil Valour, 5 December 1977.

References

Bibliography

Further reading 
 
 
 
 
 

Italian terrorism victims
1901 births
1977 deaths
20th-century Italian lawyers
People from Castelnuovo Nigra